Pitchfork & Lost Needles is a Clutch compilation album, released in 2005, of previous EPs by the band, with some demos and session outtakes.

Album information 
The album is a mix of original EPs from the early 1990s, being; the 4 track debut EP Pitchfork in 1991; the 3 track EP Passive Restraints in 1992. Tracks 1-4 are from the first EP, reissued here for the first time since 1991. Track 5, "Nero's Fiddle", is an early incarnation of "High Caliber Consecrator" from the EP Passive Restraints and which track 6 is the demo version of. Track 7 & 8 are the demo versions from the debut full-length album Transnational Speedway League and tracks 9 & 10 are from the Robot Hive/Exodus sessions in 2005 with Mick Schauer still in the band playing organ.

Track listing

Personnel 
 Neil Fallon – vocals, guitar
 Tim Sult – guitar
 Dan Maines – bass
 Jean-Paul Gaster – drums
 Mick Schauer – Hammond organ, Wurlitzer piano, clavinet
 Mark Stanley – guitar on tracks 2 & 3
 Scott Crawford – guitar on tracks 1 & 4

Production
 Produced by Clutch and J Robbins
 Recorded by Larry "Uncle Punchy" Packer
 Mixed by J Robbins and John Agnello
 Engineering by Chris Laidlaw, Larry "Uncle Punchy" Packer and Ted Young

References 

2005 compilation albums
Clutch (band) compilation albums
Megaforce Records albums